Bono is an unincorporated community in Bono Township, Lawrence County, Indiana.

History
Bono was laid out about 1816, making it the oldest settlement in Lawrence County. Bono was in considered to be Indiana's state capital.

Geography

References

Unincorporated communities in Lawrence County, Indiana
Unincorporated communities in Indiana